The 2002 Baltimore Ravens season was the team's seventh season in the National Football League (NFL). They were unable to improve upon their previous output of 10–6, instead winning only seven games and missing the playoffs for the first time in three years.

Baltimore's defense took a large step back from its normally high level of play in 2002. Star linebacker Ray Lewis suffered a shoulder injury which limited him to playing in only five games during the season, and the team finished 19th in scoring defense after finishing 4th in the NFL the previous year.

Off-season

Draft

Undrafted free agents

Staff

Roster

Preseason

Schedule

Regular season

Schedule

Apart from their AFC North division games, the Ravens played against the AFC South and NFC South according to the NFL's new conference rotation, and played the Broncos and Dolphins based on 2001 standings with respect to the newly aligned divisions.

Game summaries

Week 11: at Miami Dolphins

Standings

References

Baltimore Ravens seasons
Baltimore Ravens
Baltimore Ravens
2000s in Baltimore